"Every Step" is the promotional single released from British singer-songwriter Beverley Knight's sixth studio album, 100%. It was co-written by Knight with Cedric Perrier, Jimmy Jam and Terry Lewis, who also produced the track.

The song was added to BBC Radio 2's B-list on 17 June 2009. It was released as a free download on 6 July 2009 for two weeks.

"Every Step" subsequently received a digital download single release on 7 September 2009, alongside lead single "Beautiful Night".

Knight was interviewed and performed the song for the first time on television on GMTV on 4 September 2009. It does not have a music video. "Every Step" also featured in the 100% promotional television advert.

Track listings

6 July 2009

 Free Digital download

 "Every Step" (radio edit) – 3:24

7 September 2009

Amazon Digital maxi download bundle
	
 "Beautiful Night" (radio mix) – 3:22	 	
 "Every Step" (radio edit) – 3:24		 	
 "Beautiful Night" (Crazy Cousinz Club mix) – 4:11	 	
 "Beautiful Night" (Crazy Cousinz Club mix edit) (Amazon Exclusive) – 3:09	 	
 "Beautiful Night" (Crazy Cousinz Funky mix) – 3:53 	
 "Beautiful Night" (album version) – 4:14

iTunes Digital maxi download bundle

 "Beautiful Night" (radio mix) – 3:22	 	
 "Every Step" (radio edit) – 3:24
 "Beautiful Night" (Crazy Cousinz Club mix) – 4:11
 "Beautiful Night" (Crazy Cousinz Funky mix) – 3:53
 "Beautiful Night" (acoustic version) (iTunes Exclusive)
 "Beautiful Night" (album version) – 4:14

Play Digital maxi download bundle
 "Beautiful Night" (radio mix) – 3:22	 	
 "Every Step" (radio edit) – 3:24
 "Beautiful Night" (Crazy Cousinz Club mix) – 4:11
 "Beautiful Night" (Crazy Cousinz Funky mix) – 3:53
 "Beautiful Night" (Crazy Cousinz Club mix instrumental) (Play Exclusive) 
 "Beautiful Night" (album version) – 4:14

References

External links
 Official web site
 Official MySpace page
 Beverley Knight interview by Pete Lewis, 'Blues & Soul' July 2009

2009 singles
Beverley Knight songs
Songs written by Jimmy Jam and Terry Lewis
Songs written by Beverley Knight
Song recordings produced by Jimmy Jam and Terry Lewis
2009 songs